The Bodley Medal is awarded by the Bodleian Library at Oxford University to individuals who have made "outstanding contributions ... to the worlds of communications and literature" and who have helped the library achieve "the vision of its founder, Sir Thomas Bodley, to be a library not just to Oxford University but also to the world".

Description of the Medal
The medal's obverse shows the right profile of Thomas Bodley and bears the Latin inscription "TH BODLY EQ AVR PVBL BIBLIOTH OXON FVNDATOR", which translates "Sir Thomas Bodley, Founder of the Public Library at Oxford". The reverse reads "R P LITERARIAE AETERNITAS", which means "The Eternity of the Republic of Letters". It shows a female figure, probably representing the Republic of Letters, bearing a head in each hand. The medal is signed "Warin" on the obverse.

History
The original medal was engraved in 1646 to honour Sir Thomas Bodley who rebuilt the first public library at Oxford in 1602, now called the Bodleian Library. It was designed by Claude Warin, a leading medal-maker of the seventeenth century. Library accounts for 1646 contain the following entry: "Item, to ye painter that drew Sir Thomas Bodley's picture, and to Mr. Warren that made his medale, to each of them 2s". The original medal is gilt, probably on bronze. In 2002, on the 400th anniversary of the Bodleian Library, the copper metal saved from a renovation of the library's original roof was given to the Royal Mint to create a set of one hundred replicas of the original medal. After a hiatus of nearly 400 years, the library started granting awards of the Bodley Medal, beginning with Sir Tim Berners-Lee (inventor of the World Wide Web), Baroness P.D. James (author), and Sir Rupert Murdoch (Chairman of News Corporation).

Laureates
, the restruck Bodley Medal has been awarded to only 27 individuals.

References

Awards and prizes of the University of Oxford
Bodleian Library